Viatcheslav Moshe Kantor (born on September 8, 1953 in Moscow) is a Russian businessman and philanthropist who has close ties to the Vladimir Putin regime in Russia. Kantor heads the Acron Group, one of the leading mineral fertilizer producers and distributors in the world. 

In 2021, Forbes estimated Kantor's net worth at US$7.6 billion and the 630th richest person in the world. The Sunday Times Rich List estimated his wealth at £3.488 billion in 2020. 

Kantor was sanctioned by the British government in March 2022 the wake of the Russian invasion of Ukraine. Consequently University College School has decided to review the name of its sports pavilion which is named after Kantor.

Kantor was President of the European Jewish Congress, President of the World Holocaust Forum Foundation (WHF), Chairman of the European Jewish Fund (EJF), and Chairman of the World Jewish Congress (WJC) Policy Council.

Early life and education
Kantor was born and spent his early years in Moscow, and obtained a degree from the Moscow Aviation Institute (MAI) in 1976 and did research for MAI and NPO Spektr. In 1981, he completed his PhD in Spacecraft Automatic Control Systems. He worked as a scientist and headed one of MAI research laboratories.

Career 
In 1989–1993, Kantor was Director General of Intelmas, a telecoms company. In 1996–2000 he was an economic adviser to the Chairman of the Federation Council of the Russian Federal Assembly.

Kantor heads the Acron Group, one of the leading mineral fertilizer producers and distributors in the world. He has close ties to the Vladimir Putin regime in Russia.

Civic activities
Kantor was President of the European Jewish Congress. The EJC, the largest secular organization representing the interests of European Jewry, is an influential, international public association representing 2.5 million Jews across the European continent in 42 national Jewish communities.

In 2021, he was reelected Chairman of the Policy Council of the World Jewish Congress for the third time Kantor is a Vice President of the Jewish Leadership Council. In 2010, he established the Kantor Center for the Study of Contemporary European Jewry at Tel Aviv University. In 2019, Yad Vashem nominated Moshe Kantor as Chancellor of the Council, and before it he served as its Member of Directorate since 2010. Kantor was President of the Russian Jewish Congress (RJC) in 2005–2009. He founded and headed the World Holocaust Forum (WHF) in 2005 and the European Jewish Fund in 2006. Kantor is a founder and chairman of the European Jewish Fund (EJF).

He has chaired the World Holocaust Forum Foundation. In 2020, the World Holocaust Forum organized by Kantor came under controversy after Vladimir Putin was allowed to give a speech that distorted the history of the Soviet Union in World War II. The forum refused to allow Polish President Andrzej Duda to have a speaking slot.

He is the founder and president of President of the European Council on Tolerance and Reconciliation (ECTR).

In 2007, Kantor founded and was elected president of the International Luxembourg Forum on Preventing Nuclear Catastrophe, an international non-governmental organisation uniting leading world-renowned experts on nuclear non-proliferation, materials and delivery vehicles. The Forum was established pursuant to a decision of the International Conference held in Luxembourg on May 24–25, 2007. The conference was attended by over 50 renowned experts from 14 countries, including Sergey Kirienko, Director General of the Rosatom State Atomic Energy Corporation, Mohamed ElBaradei, Director General of the International Atomic Energy Agency (IAEA), Nikolay Laverov, Academician and Vice President of the Russian Academy of Sciences (RAS), William Perry, former Secretary of the U.S. Department of Defense, and Hans Blix, Chairman of the Weapons of Mass Destruction Commission and former Director General of the IAEA.

Personal life
Kantor is married to Anna Kantor and has four sons and a daughter. Kantor is a citizen of Russia, the United Kingdom and Israel.

Kantor bought a violin made by the Italian violin maker Riccardo Antoniazzi in 1912. The violin has been given as a First Prize of the 2nd International Violinists Vladimir Spivakov Contest. Its price was $140,000.

Kantor is a trustee and Life President of the Anna Freud Centre (London, UK).  Kantor was previously a patron of King Solomon High School (London, UK). Kantor supported the development of the school which is a Jewish Comprehensive school based in Redbridge.

Kantor has been a benefactor of the Royal Opera House Covent Garden Foundation since 2013, in which capacity he has facilitated various projects.

Kantor was appointed Life Governor and Trustee of the King Edward VII's Hospital in London after his charitable foundation funded the redevelopment of the site adjacent to the hospital, Macintosh House, which was subsequently renamed the Kantor Medical Centre.

Kantor is president of the Museum of Avant-Garde Mastery (MAGMA), founded in 2001 in Moscow on Kantor's initiative.

In 2018, President of the Russian Academy of Arts and People's Artist of the URSS Zurab Tsereteli officially awarded Kantor as the President of MAGMA Museum with the robe and diploma of Honorary Member of the Russian Academy of Arts.

Honors and awards
Kantor received the following government awards: Order of Friendship (Russia, 1998), Officer's Cross of the Order of Merit (Poland, 2005), Order of Prince Yaroslav the Wise (Ukraine, 2006), Order of Leopold (Belgium, 2009), Chevalier of the National Order of the Legion of Honour (France, 2012), Knight’s Grand Cross of the Order of Merit of the Italian Republic (Italy, 2013), Grand Cross with honours of the National Order of Merit (Romania, 2014), Officer of the National Order of the Legion of Honour (France, 2014, presented in 2015), The Order of Honour (Russia, 2016), Officer of the Order of the Crown (Belgium, 2020) and Grand Decoration of Honour in Gold for Services to the Republic of Austria (Austria, 2021).

He is an honorary citizen of Veliky Novgorod (1997) and Honorary Member of the Russian Academy of Arts.

In addition, he received an honorary doctorate from Tel-Aviv University (2004) and the Medal of Merit "Deserved for Tolerance" by the Ecumenical Foundation Tolerance (2011).

Kantor has been recognized for seven consecutive years as one of the '50 Most Influential Jews in the World'.

In 1997, Viatcheslav Kantor was named Honorary Citizen of Veliky Novgorod.

See also
 European Jewish Congress
 World Jewish Congress
 European Council on Tolerance and Reconciliation
 International Luxembourg Forum on Preventing Nuclear Catastrophe
 European Jewish Fund
 World Holocaust Forum
 Museum of Avant-Garde Mastery

References

External links
 Viatcheslav Moshe Kantor (website)
 European Jewish Congress
 European Jewish Fund
 Kantor Center on the Study of Contemporary European Jewry
 
 National Institute of Corporate Reform

1953 births
Living people
Museum founders
Jewish anti-racism activists
Russian Jews
Russian billionaires

Officiers of the Légion d'honneur
Chevaliers of the Légion d'honneur
Knights Grand Cross of the Order of Merit of the Italian Republic
Recipients of the Order of Prince Yaroslav the Wise
Officers of the Order of Merit of the Republic of Poland
Recipients of the Order of Honour (Russia)
Recipients of the Order of Merit of the Italian Republic
Grand Crosses of the Order of the Star of Romania
Russian businesspeople in the United Kingdom
Russian oligarchs
Russian individuals subject to European Union sanctions
Russian individuals subject to United Kingdom sanctions